Albert William Goodman (1880 – 22 August 1937) was a Conservative politician in the United Kingdom.

At the 1929 general election, he unsuccessfully contested the safe Labour seat of Bow and Bromley in east London, losing to the incumbent George Lansbury by a wide margin.

As Labour's vote collapsed at the 1931 general election, he won the Islington North from the constituency's Labour Member of Parliament (MP) Robert Young, who had gained it from the Conservatives in 1929.

Goodman held his seat at the 1935 election, and died in 1937, aged 57 (the first of three 20th-century MPs from that constituency to die in office). At the following by-election, the Labour candidate, Leslie Haden Guest, won the seat for his party.

References
 UK General Elections since 1832

External links
 

1880 births
1937 deaths
Conservative Party (UK) MPs for English constituencies
UK MPs 1931–1935
UK MPs 1935–1945